Bond Street is a major shopping street in the West End of London.

Bond Street may also refer to:

Places and structures
 Bond Street (Manhattan), a street in New York City, US
 Bond Street (Toronto), a street in Toronto, Ontario, Canada
 Bond Street Centre, now Trinity Leeds, a shopping and leisure centre in Leeds, England
 Bond Street Historic District, Augusta, Maine, US
 Bond Street station, a London Underground and Elizabeth line station

Other uses
 Bond Street (cigarette), a brand of cigarette
 Bond Street (film), a 1948 British film
 Bond Street Theatre, a New York City-based international theatre project
 "Bond Street", a 1967 song by Burt Bacharach from Reach Out